is a 32-episode comedy and card battle anime television series produced by Bushiroad. It is animated by Fanworks and Forest Hunting One, and ran on NHK E from April 1, 2014 to February 10, 2015. An English dub of the series began airing May 27, 2017 on Disney XD Asia., under the title Gigant Big-Shot Tsukasa.

Characters

References

External links
 

Bushiroad
Fanworks (animation studio)
Japanese children's animated comedy television series
Comedy anime and manga
Computer-animated television series